Zizyphia cleodorella is a moth in the family Gelechiidae. It was described by Pierre Chrétien in 1908. It is found in Algeria.

References

Gelechiinae
Moths described in 1908